Demodex gapperi is a hair follicle mite found in the eyelids of the red-backed vole, Clethrionomys gapperi.

References

Trombidiformes
Animals described in 1971